Musical anhedonia is a neurological condition characterized by an inability to derive pleasure from music. People with this condition, unlike those suffering from music agnosia, can recognize and understand music but fail to enjoy it. 

Research has shown that people with this condition have reduced functional connectivity between the cortical regions responsible for processing sound and the subcortical regions related to reward.

History 
Case studies of musical anhedonia and its symptoms date from 1993.

The term "musical anhedonia" was first used in 2011. It was originally used to describe the selective loss in emotional responses to music following damage to the brain. It has now come to mean, more generally, a selective lack of pleasurable responses to music in individuals with or without brain damage. This has led to the recognition of two different types of musical anhedonia.

The first type, known as "musical anhedonia without brain damage", manifests itself in individuals that do not present any neurological damage. Its incidence in the general population is low: between 3% and 5%.  The second type is known as "acquired musical anhedonia". It is this form that develops as a result of brain damage. The incidence of this second form is even lower, and most studies of it focus on individual cases.

Research 
A 2014 study correlated participants' reported enjoyment of music with neurological activity, as measured by Functional magnetic resonance imaging (fMRI). It found that those who reported stronger emotional reactions to music had greater neurological activity linking the auditory cortex and mesolimbic pathway of the brain. This suggests that specific musical anhedonia exists as a discrete neurological condition, rather than a symptom of general anhedonia.

Music therapy may be ineffective for people with musical anhedonia, as is the case with certain other diseases and conditions such as Parkinson's disease and Alzheimer's disease. A 2019 study found that specific music-based treatments may alleviate anhedonia and other depression symptoms.

Social stigma
Music is often considered to be a universal language, and individuals with musical anhedonia may find it difficult to understand why they do not gain pleasure from it. Two core societal benefits have emerged from the new empirical research into the condition: it has helped people with the condition to better understand why they are affected by it; and it has helped to demonstrate to the rest of the population that it is a genuine condition that impacts the lives of many people. 

Northeastern University professors investigated whether the correlation between music and the brain can impair "social bonding". They could link similar images of the brain of an autistic person with the images of the brain of a person with musical anhedonia.

See also 
 Amusia
 Auditory agnosia
 Neuroscience of music

References

Music psychology